Mátyás is a Hungarian given name meaning Matthias.

Notable people with the given name Mátyás:

 Mátyás Bél, Hungarian scientist
 Mátyás Cseszneky, Hungarian magnate and cavalry commander
 Mátyás Rákosi, Hungarian communist politician, dictator of Hungary in the 1950s
 Mátyás Seiber, Hungarian-born composer who lived in England from 1935 onward
 Mátyás Szűrös, Hungarian politician
 Matthias Corvinus of Hungary is called Mátyás in Hungarian

See also
 Matthew (name)

Hungarian masculine given names